Paul Esposti (born 1 November 1972) is a Welsh racing cyclist, from Cardiff, Wales. who finished 5th in the Road Race at the 1998 Commonwealth Games in Kuala Lumpur. He now lives in Colorado, United States.

Palmarès

1994
7th  British National Road Race Championships

1995
1st  Welsh National Road Race Championships
8th  British National Road Race Championships

1996
1st Paris-Auxerre 

1997
9th  British National Road Race Championships
1st Stage 4, Tour de Haute Marne 

1998
5th  Commonwealth Games Road Race, Kuala Lumpur
1st Final Classification Tour de Haute Marne 

1999
4th  British National Circuit Race Championships
1st Stage 3, Tour of Lancashire, Premier Calendar Event
2nd Tour of the Cotswolds, Premier Calendar Event
2nd Five Valleys GP, Premier Calendar Event
3rd Stage 12, Commonwealth Bank Classic 
4th Stage 1, Commonwealth Bank Classic 

2004
1st Deer Trail Road Race
1st Golden Criterium
1st Estees Cycling Challenge

2005
1st Boulder-Roubaix
1st Louisville Criterium
1st Stage 4, Amateur Tour of the Gila
4th Amateur Tour of the Gila

2008
8th  US Elite National Criterium Championships

2009
5th  US Elite National Road Race Championships
1st Bannock Street Criterium Masters

2010
10th  British Road Race Championships
18th  Commonwealth Games Road Race, Delhi
1st Colorado Masters Road Championships
1st Bannock Street Criterium Masters
1st Prairie Center Criterium Masters
1st Sunshine Hill Climb Masters
1st BRC Real Estate Criterium Masters
1st Wheels of Thunder

External links
Results

1972 births
Living people
Welsh male cyclists
Commonwealth Games competitors for Wales
Cyclists at the 1998 Commonwealth Games
Sportspeople from Cardiff